Fibularia is a genus of echinoderms belonging to the family Fibulariidae. The genus has almost a cosmopolitan distribution.

Species
There are six recognized species:
 Fibularia coffea Tanaka, Wakabayashi & Fujita, 2019
 Fibularia cribellum de Meijere, 1903
 Fibularia japonica Shigei, 1982
 Fibularia nutriens H.L. Clark, 1909
 Fibularia ovulum Lamarck, 1816
 Fibularia plateia H.L. Clark, 1928

Subgenus Fibularia (Fibulariella) Mortensen, 1948 has been raised  to genus rank as Fibulariella Mortensen, 1948.

References

Clypeasteroida
Echinoidea genera
Taxa named by Jean-Baptiste Lamarck